Anchor Stone Blocks are components  of stone construction sets made in Rudolstadt, Germany, marketed as a construction toy.

Description
Anchor Stone pieces are made of a mixture of quartz sand, chalk, and linseed oil (German Patent 13,770; US Patent 233,780), precisely pressed in molds so that they fit together perfectly. The stones come in three colors in imitation of the red brick, tan limestone, and blue slate of European buildings. They are not recommended for play by children under 3 years of age because of their small size (CE No. 0494).

History

Origin
Anchor stones originated with the wooden building blocks designed by Friedrich Fröbel, the creator of the Kindergarten system of education. He had observed how children enjoyed playing with geometrically-shaped blocks.

The first Anchor Stone was produced when Otto Lilienthal and his brother Gustav decided to make a model of a stone building, using miniature blocks of stone. To this end, they started production of a limited number of blocks, made of a mixture of quartz sand, chalk, and linseed oil. Unfortunately, the Lilienthals, though brilliant inventors, had limited commercial success.

The stone blocks saw little popularity until 1880, when Friedrich Adolf Richter, a wealthy businessman who had built a small empire in Rudolstadt, purchased the rights to the process for 1000 marks, plus about 4800 marks (including 800 marks still owing) for the tooling and machines being used to produce them. He developed a series of sets of individually-packaged stones, which quickly became popular. Promoted by extensive advertising, 42,000 sets were sold in 1883 (Annual Report for 1883 of the Schwarzburg-Rudolstadt Factory Inspection Service, Archives, Heidecksburg, Rudolstadt). In 1894, Richter applied his "Anchor" trademark to the Richter's Anchor Stone Building Sets (Richters Anker-Steinbaukasten).  More than 600 different sets were produced over the multi-decade life of these sets; more than 1,000 stone shapes were made (CVA Stone Catalog). In 1910 Richter died, heralding the end of the first era for Anchor Stones (Registered as death # 878 in Jena on December 27, 1910; he died at 9:00 PM on December 25, 1910).

End and rebirth
Although Anchor Stones survived World War I and World War II, the factory was included within Communist East Germany when the Iron Curtain divided Europe. In 1953, the company was nationalized as VEB Anker-Steinbaukasten, a state-owned company. In 1963, the production of the blocks was stopped.  The trademark "Anker" was used by various toy companies in East Germany, none of which were related to the stone building set factory.

However, existing sets of old Anchor Stones remained very popular within the international community. In 1979, the Club van Ankervrienden ("Club of Anchor Friends") was founded in the Netherlands.  Initially the membership was limited to Dutch members, but foreign members were admitted starting in 1983.  Today the club has about 230 members. With the support of the Club of Anchor Friends, the state of Thuringia, and the European Union, Georg Plenge was able to resurrect the company as Anker Steinbaukasten GmbH. Production at the factory in Rudolstadt restarted 15 September 1994, and new sets were sold to Club members in October 1994.

Anchor today

The new factory manufactures and sells all 15 of the sets in the main series (GK-NF) of Anchor sets as well as some sets modelling the Michaelis Basilika in Hildesheim and the Brandenburg Gate.  They are widely available in Germany, including in the KaDeWe department store in Berlin, and are readily available online.  A new series of sets for younger children called Die neue Steinzeit ("the new Stone Age") was introduced in 2012.  The sets tend to be expensive, but high-quality; antique sets are just as playable now as when they were originally produced. Sets being produced today are made to the same specifications as the antique ones, so they can be easily integrated. In addition to construction sets, the artificial stone formula has been used to produce simple flat puzzles, such as tangrams.

Cultural influences
Scientists, engineers, and designers like Max Born, J. Robert Oppenheimer, Albert Einstein, Ivan Sutherland and Walter Gropius developed their creativity by playing with Anchor blocks. Anchor blocks have been exhibited in the Louvre and Deutsches Museum. They appear in a fairly prominent role in Jan Švankmajer's fantasy film Neco z Alenky as, among other things, the home of the White Rabbit.  They also support a plot sequence in The Diamond in the Window, by Jane Langton.

References

External links

 Website by Anchor enthusiast George Hardy
 Website of the Anker Archive
 Richter's Anchor Stone Building Sets (with digitized photos), Canadian Centre for Architecture

Construction toys
Manufacturing companies of Germany
Rudolstadt
Toy companies of Germany
Educational toys
Toy companies established in the 19th century
German companies established in 1880